Pala Mesa is an unincorporated community in San Diego County, California, United States. It sits adjacent to the town of Fallbrook.

History
It was advertised in association with nearby Fallbrook. Construction on the Pala Mesa Golf Course, which sits in the northwestern corner of the Pala Mesa area adjacent to the former U.S. Route 395 and the current Interstate 15, began construction in March 1961. The course opened in 1963.

Pala Mesa Village, a neighborhood of smaller homes near the I-15 and SR-76 interchange, was approved for construction in July 1963. The San Diego County Board of Supervisors rejected the notion. The developers began selling homes in the community in October 1965 and the adobe brick homes were advertised as "America's first adobe community."

In July 1964, professional golfer Shirley Englehorn golfed at the Pala Mesa Golf Course and set a new record for the course with a four-under-par. The course became the home of the Palomar College men's golf team in 1965.

References

Unincorporated communities in California
Unincorporated communities in San Diego County, California